Arctostaphylos hooveri, the Santa Lucia manzanita, is a plant species endemic to the Santa Lucia Mountains in Monterey County, California. It grows in woodlands and in chaparral scrub-land at elevations of 900–1200 m.

Arctostaphylos hooveri is a shrub or tree up to 8 meters tall, but typically ranges between 1 to 6 meters tall and 1 to 3 meters wide. Leaves are egg-shaped, whitish with wax, up to 6 cm long. Flowers are white, conical to urn-shaped, in branched panicles, and have red stems. Fruits are spherical or nearly so, about 8 mm in diameter.

Communities
Communities where arctostaphylos hooveri is commonly found in include the Northern Coastal Sage Scrub, Northern Juniper Woodland, Coastal Prairie, Redwood Forest, Riparian, Sub-Alpine Forest and Yellow Pine Forest. This plant survives best at a pH of 5.00-6.00 with 100–160 cm of rainfall per year. This is a rare plant that survives best in the sunny coastal regions of California.

References

hooveri
Endemic flora of California
Natural history of the California chaparral and woodlands
Natural history of the California Coast Ranges
~
Natural history of Monterey County, California
Flora without expected TNC conservation status